The following waterways are known as a London canal:

 Regent's Canal
 The Paddington Arm of the Grand Union Canal

See also

 Hertford Union Canal
 Limehouse Cut